, is a peak in the Akaishi Mountains, on the border of Shizuoka and Nagano Prefectures in central Honshū, Japan.

On June 1, 1964, the mountain was included within the Minami Alps National Park.

Geography
At , Mount Akaish is the 7th tallest peak in Japan and the 4th tallest peak in the Akaishi Mountains. The peak is located within the Minami Alps National Park.

There is a triangulation station on the summit, with a Mountain hut located below, on its southern approach. On the eastern slope is a cirque, with the trace remnants of Japan's southernmost glacier.

At the timberline are stands of Siberian dwarf pine, above which are numerous flowering alpine plants, and the habitat for the Rock Ptarmigan.

Ascents
The first recorded ascent of Mount Akaishi was by Haruki Nashiba and Masaaki Terasawa of the Japanese Home Ministry in 1879. They were followed in July 1881 by a government survey team, which established the triangulation station. Ascent of the mountain became popular after a road was established to its base in 1886. The first westerner to ascend the mountain was the English missionary and mountaineer, Walter Weston on August 19, 1892.

In 1906, Usui Kojima of the Japan Alpine Club devoted the first issue of the club's magazine, Sangaku, to Mount Akashi, and Usui pioneered a new route up the mountain in 1909. In the summer of 1926, the 88-year-old founder of the Ōkura zaibatsu, Okura Kihachiro, decided that he wanted to visit the highest point of his company's holdings, and climbed Mount Akaki with the assistance of 200 porters using palanquin.

Gallery

See also
 53157 Akaishidake
 Akaishi Mountains
 Minami Alps National Park
 List of mountains in Japan
 100 Famous Japanese Mountains
 Three-thousanders (in Japan)

References

Akaishi Mountains
Mount Akaishi
Mountains of Nagano Prefecture
Mountains of Shizuoka Prefecture
Mount Akaishi